The Nyke/Tussen Nature Reserve is located in the municipality of Bø in Nordland county, Norway.

The nature reserve lies north of the Nykvåg/Nykan Nature Reserve and south of the Frugga Nature Reserve, and it includes a pebble beach between Nykvåg and Hovden. The area is protected in order to safeguard one of the largest and geomorphologically best-formed pebble beaches in Nordland. The nature reserve was established on December 6, 2002.

References

External links
 Nykvåg/Nykan, Nyke/Tussen og Frugga. Map and description of the nature reserve.
 Miljøverndepartementet. 2002. Nyke/Tussen naturreservat, Bø kommune, Nordland. 1:7,500 map of the nature reserve.

Nature reserves in Norway
Protected areas of Nordland
Bø, Nordland
Protected areas established in 2002